Ali Yağmur (born 1 January 1943) is a Turkish former wrestler who competed in the 1972 Summer Olympics.

References

External links
 

1943 births
Living people
Olympic wrestlers of Turkey
Wrestlers at the 1972 Summer Olympics
Turkish male sport wrestlers